The Rugby League Asian Cup was a rugby league football tournament for Asian nations that was held in 2012 and 2013. Both editions of the tournament featured the Philippines and Thailand playing each other once. It is run by the Asia-Pacific Rugby League Confederation and the Trophy itself was donated by the RLIF.

History

On October 21, 2012, the Philippines Tamaraws defeated the Thailand Stars to win the inaugural Rugby League Asian Cup. and on October 23, 2013, the Philippines again defeated Thailand at the second Asian Cup.

Trophy

On October 21, 2012, after beating Thailand in the Asian Cup final, Philippines captain Luke Srama was presented with the first Asian Cup trophy. Srama was also presented with a Friendship Cup as a good gesture between the two teams.

Format
The format of the inaugural Rugby League Asian Cup involved a one-off match held in Bangkok between Thailand and the Philippines to decide the champion of the tournament.

Future
It is expected in the future editions of the Asian Cup that the Japan national rugby league team and Singapore will compete in the tournament. It is also hoped that other Asian nations will compete in the future. Japan has planned hosting the tournament in 2014

Results

Asian Cup summaries

Successful national teams

The Philippines is the only nation to have won the Asian Cup.

The following list, are all the teams that have competed in the Asian Cup tournament since its inception; the number of times they have appeared; their most recent appearance; consecutive appearances and their highest result:

Records and statistics

Overall Championships
As of the 2013 edition

Overall top 5 pointscorers
As of the 2012 edition

Asian Cup winning captains and coaches
As of the 2013 edition

See also

Rugby League International Federation
RLIF World Rankings
List of International Rugby League Teams
European Cup
Mediterranean Cup
Pacific Cup
Asian Rugby League Federation

External links
 Rugby League International Federation
 https://web.archive.org/web/20131109015829/http://asianrugbyleague.com/

References

 
Rugby league international tournaments
Rugby league competitions in the Philippines
Rugby league in Asia